The Brisbane Heritage Register is a heritage register containing a list of culturally-significant places within the City of Brisbane, Queensland, Australia. Under Section 113 of the Queensland Heritage Act 1992, all local government authorities in Queensland must maintain a local heritage register.

Criteria
Listings on the Brisbane Heritage Register are made on the recommendation of the council's architects and historians in consultation with the Heritage Advisory Committee.

Places on the heritage register must satisfy one or more of these criteria:
 illustrates the evolution or pattern in local history
 has rare, uncommon or endangered aspects of cultural heritage
 aids the knowledge and understanding of local history
 illustrates the important characteristics of a particular class cultural places
 has aesthetic significance
 was very creative or technologically advanced for its period
 has special links to a particular community or cultural group
 has special links to a significant local historical person or organisation

See also
:Category:Brisbane Local Heritage Register for list of sites on the Brisbane Heritage Register with Wikipedia articles

References

External links
 
 Search the Brisbane Heritage Register

 
 
Local heritage registers in Queensland
Culture of Brisbane